Jan Šverma (23 March 1901, Mnichovo Hradiště – 10 November 1944, Mt. Chabenec, Low Tatras) was a Czech journalist, communist activist and resistance fighter against the Nazi-backed Slovak State, considered a national hero in the Czechoslovak Socialist Republic.

Biography

Šverma joined the Communist Party of Czechoslovakia (KSČ) in 1921. He contributed to Rudé právo, the official publication of the KSČ and was its editor-in-chief from 1936 to 1938. From 1929 he was a member of the KSČ Central Committee and Politburo. Šverma spent time in exile in Paris and Moscow during the existence of the Nazi-backed Slovak State and was close to Klement Gottwald, the Chairman of the KSČ, who later would become the first Communist president of Czechoslovakia.

Šverma assumed the political leadership of Czechoslovak military units formed in the Soviet Union during the Nazi invasion of the USSR. He died of exhaustion on the mountain Chabenec in the Low Tatras mountain range during a snowstorm on 10 November 1944, while leading an insurrection of Slovak communists against the Slovak State.

Legacy
A bridge in Prague at the former location of the Franz Joseph Bridge was named after Šverma in 1951. The village Telgárt in Slovakia was called Švermovo from 1948 to 1990. The metro station in Prague presently named Jinonice was formerly called Švermova. Many places named after communist-era heroes were renamed after the Velvet Revolution.

References

1901 births
1944 deaths
People from Mnichovo Hradiště
People from the Kingdom of Bohemia
Communist Party of Czechoslovakia politicians
Members of the Chamber of Deputies of Czechoslovakia (1935–1939)
Czech communists
International Lenin School alumni
Heroes of the Czechoslovak Socialist Republic